Walter Perón (born 30 September 1929) is a Peruvian former sports shooter. He competed at the 1968 Summer Olympics and the 1980 Summer Olympics.

References

External links
  

1929 births
Possibly living people
Peruvian male sport shooters
Olympic shooters of Peru
Shooters at the 1968 Summer Olympics
Shooters at the 1980 Summer Olympics
20th-century Peruvian people